Thomas Frederick Richard Attenborough (born 13 October 1986) is an English voice actor and theatre director. He is the son of theatre director Michael Attenborough, grandson of the late film actor and director Richard Attenborough and the great nephew of broadcaster David Attenborough.

Life
Born in October 1986, the first of two boys for Michael Attenborough and Karen, his wife. Attenborough was raised in London and attended St Paul's School. He then went to Trinity College, Cambridge to study English Literature. He graduated in 2009 and became artistic director of Rhapsody of Words Productions in 2010. In 2011 he won a runner-up prize for the JMK Award, and in 2012 was made an Associate Artist of HighTide Festival Theatre. In 2016 he became associate director of the Watermill Theatre, Newbury.

Career

Voice acting
His career began as a voiceover artist. After joining Hobson's International's children's division, he voiced Christopher Robin in The Tigger Movie and Harry Potter in the Harry Potter video games.

Directing
Attenborough works as a freelance theatre director in and around London. His first job was as an assistant director to Rachel Chavkin on The American Capitalism Project. Since then his career has included work at the National Theatre, the Minerva Theatre Chichester, the Almeida Theatre, MCS Oxford, The Old Vic, the Menier Chocolate Factory, the Hampstead Theatre, Theatre Royal Bath and the West End. Early productions included The Shape of Things by Neil LaBute at The Gallery Soho in London, and the regional premiere of The Mountaintop by Katori Hall for Derby LIVE.

Rhapsody of Words presented a revival of Conor McPherson's play Port Authority at the Southwark Playhouse, starring Ardal O'Hanlon, John Rogan and Andrew Nolan in 2012. They then produced Rashid Razaq's new play, The President and the Pakistani, at the Waterloo East Theatre. Both productions were directed by Attenborough. Their production of Cinderella and the Beanstalk, the world's first 3-man family pantomime, at Theatre503, which premiered in December 2014 and returned in 2015 to sell-out audiences and great critical acclaim.

Attenborough directed a new play by Rob Hayes, Step 9 (of 12), starring Blake Harrison, at London's Trafalgar Studios in May 2012. He directed revivals of Abigail's Party and Noises Off, both of which toured the UK in the first half of 2013. In 2015 Attenborough directed Morgan Lloyd Malcolm's new play The Wasp at the Hampstead Theatre Downstairs, starring Sinead Matthews and MyAnna Buring. He also had hits with The Whipping Man at Theatre Royal Plymouth and the Pulitzer-Prize winning Dinner with Friends at Park Theatre.

The Wasp transferred to the West End in 2016, with Buring reprising her role opposite Laura Donnelly. In 2016 Attenborough also directed a major UK tour of Noël Coward's Private Lives, as well as the regional premiere of Untold Stories by Alan Bennett.

In March 2017, Attenborough directed the West End debut of Tony Award Winner Stephen Karam's play Speech and Debate at London's Trafalgar Studios.

He works as an English teacher at St Paul's Girls' School.

Filmography

Film

Video games

References

External links
 

1986 births
Living people
English theatre directors
English male film actors
English male video game actors
Tom